Bettie M. Steinberg holds multiple positions within Northwell Health: Chief Scientific Officer for The Feinstein Institute for Medical Research, Dean of the Elmezzi Graduate School of Molecular Medicine (both in Manhasset, NY), and Chair of the Department of Molecular Medicine at the Hofstra Northwell School of Medicine in Hempstead, NY.

Education
Steinberg did her undergraduate work at the University of California, Riverside, completing her degree in 1959. In 1967, she earned a master's degree in Biology from Adelphi University. In 1973, she returned to academia for her Ph.D. in microbiology, which she received from the State University of New York, Stony Brook in 1976 for her work on bacterial viruses. She then did a postdoctoral fellowship at SUNY Stony Brook, studying mammalian tumor viruses.

Academic appointments
After her post-doctoral fellowship, Steinberg moved to Columbia University, where she spent two years as a Senior Research Associate. She then joined the Department of Otolaryngology at Long Island Jewish Medical Center and joined The Feinstein Institute for Medical Research when it was established in 2000. She also holds academic appointments as Professor at the Elmezzi Graduate School and Professor of Molecular Medicine and Otolaryngology at the Hofstra Northwell School of Medicine;.

Principal scientific contributions
At Long Island Jewish Medical Center, Steinberg began her studies of human papillomaviruses (HPVs) and their role in diseases of the head and neck, especially recurrent respiratory papillomatosis. These studies have been supported by grants from the National Institute of Health (NIH) since 1983. Steinberg, collaborating with Allan Abramson, M.D., discovered that HPVs establish latent infections, which are the source of recurrent disease. Steinberg has dissected the molecular biology of papillomas, discovering that their signaling systems are altered in HPV infection and the cells don’t get the right messages to carry out their normal functions.

Awards and honors

 Robert K. Match Distinguished Scientist Award
 Long Island Achiever in Science Award from Long Island Center for Business and Professional Women
 Elliot Osserman Award from the Israel Cancer Research Fund
 Karl Storz Award from the American Society of Pediatric Oncology
 Lorinda de Roulet Award for Excellence in Research
 Israel Cancer Research Fund Award for Women of Excellence
 Science Achiever Award from the School-Business Partnerships of Long Island, Inc.

References

Living people
Year of birth missing (living people)
Women microbiologists
American microbiologists
University of California, Riverside alumni
Adelphi University alumni
Stony Brook University alumni